Fred L. Warner (1877-1942) was a Republican politician who served in the Michigan House of Representatives for Ionia County from 1915–1922. He served as Speaker of the House during the 51st Legislature.

Born in Penn Yan, New York in 1877, Warner moved to Michigan and graduated with a law degree from the University of Michigan in 1907. He then went into private practice in Belding, later being appointed the city attorney. Warner was elected to the House in 1914 and served four terms, his last was as Speaker. He was defeated in the primary election in 1922. He died in Lansing, Michigan in 1942.

References

1877 births
People from Belding, Michigan
People from Penn Yan, New York
University of Michigan Law School alumni
Republican Party members of the Michigan House of Representatives
New York (state) Republicans
Speakers of the Michigan House of Representatives
1942 deaths